Bessarion is a lunar impact crater located near the southwest edge of Mare Imbrium. It is named after Greek scholar Bessarion. Some distance to the east is the crater T. Mayer. Bessarion is a bowl-shaped crater with a low central rise and a higher albedo than the maria, making it a brighter feature when the sun is overhead.

Just to the north of Bessarion is a smaller crater Bessarion E that also has a relatively high albedo. This crater is sometimes called Virgil, although this name is not officially recognized by the IAU.

Satellite craters
By convention these features are identified on lunar maps by placing the letter on the side of the crater midpoint that is closest to Bessarion.

References

 
 
 
 
 
 
 
 
 
 
 

Impact craters on the Moon